Events in the year 1853 in India.

Events
 April 16 – The first Indian train steamed off from Bombay to Thane. The train was drawn by three steam locomotives and covered the 34 km distance in 57 minutes.
The Nizam of Hyderabad cedes Berar to the British so that its revenues could support the Hyderabad contingent in the British army .
Annexations of Jhansi and Nagpur.

Law
Coinage (Colonial Offences) Act
Customs Consolidation Act

Births
 Chattampi Swamikal, Hindu sage and social reformer (died 1924).

References

 
India
Years of the 19th century in India